This article lists some of the events that took place in the Netherlands in 2004.

Incumbents
Monarch: Beatrix
Prime Minister: Jan Peter Balkenende

Events

January
 January 13 – A 17-year-old student shoots and kills vice principal Hans van Wieren at the Terra College in The Hague.
 January – The second highest residential tower of  The Netherlands is finished in Tilburg.

February

March
 March 20 – Queen Juliana dies age 94 in Soestdijk Palace.

April
 April 1 – An attempt is made to overrun politician Jozias van Aartsen with a car.

May

June

July

August

September

October
 October 2 – An estimate 200.000 people demonstrate in Amsterdam against the plans of the government. The demonstration is organized by the platform Keer het Tij (Turn the Tide) and "Nederland verdient beter" (the Netherlands deserve better).
 October 27 – Official edition of the New Bible translation (Nieuwe Bijbelvertaling, NBV) by the most important Dutch church fellowships.

November
 November 2 – Film-director Theo van Gogh is murdered in Amsterdam by Muslim-extremist Mohammed Bouyeri. The Syrian Redouan al-Issar, clerical leader of the Hofstad Network leaves the country on a false passport.
 November 10 — Police raid in Laakkwartier, The Hague.
 November 15 – The assassinated politician Pim Fortuyn is announced as The Greatest Dutchman.
 November 17 – Hella Haasse receives the Prijs der Nederlandse Letteren.

December
 December 1 – Prince Bernhard dies in Utrecht.
 December 26 – 36 Dutch people are among the victims of the 2004 Indian Ocean tsunami.
 December – Global Credit Data is formed.

Sport
 August 13–29 Netherlands at the 2004 Summer Olympics
 September 17–28 Netherlands at the 2004 Summer Paralympics
 September 27 - October 3 Netherlands at the 2004 UCI Road World Championships
 The Dutch team won 1 gold, 2 silver and 1 bronze medals, finishing third in the medal table.
Marianne Vos won gold in the Women's junior road race and Ellen van Dijk the bronze medal, Thomas Dekker won silver in both the Men's under-23 time trial and Men's under-23 road race.
October 17: Robert Cheboror wins the Amsterdam Marathon

See also
 2003–04 Eredivisie
 2003–04 Eerste Divisie
 2003–04 KNVB Cup
 2004 Johan Cruijff Schaal

Births

 21 March – Count Claus-Casimir of Orange-Nassau, Jonkheer van Amsberg

Deaths

See also
2004 in Dutch television

References

 
Years of the 21st century in the Netherlands
2000s in the Netherlands
Netherlands